The rih is an instrument that was popular in Eastern Ukraine and Russia, with between three and six fingerholes. Usually they were made from a cylindrical reed with a cow's horn to form the bell. The mouthpiece usually has a single reed although occasionally double reed instruments can be found.

See also
Ukrainian folk music
Russian traditional music
Erke
Erkencho

References

Sources
Humeniuk, A. - Ukrainski narodni muzychni instrumenty - Kyiv: Naukova dumka, 1967
Mizynec, V. - Ukrainian Folk Instruments - Melbourne: Bayda books, 1984
Cherkaskyi, L. - Ukrainski narodni muzychni instrumenty // Tekhnika, Kyiv, Ukraine, 2003 - 262 pages.

External links
УКРАИНСКИЕ НАРОДНЫЕ МУЗЫКАЛЬНЫЕ ИНСТРУМЕНТЫ - СЕМПЛЫ (Ukrainian Folk Musical Instruments - Samples) at Vasyltkach.com
Рог – русский народный музыкальный инструмент (Rog is a Russian folk musical instrument)

External fipple flutes
Hornpipes
Ukrainian musical instruments
Russian musical instruments